Garbally House is a country house built by the Lord Clancarty in the 17th century. It has two floors and fine views over Ballinasloe. It is situated beside Garbally College (Garbally Court), which is an all boys secondary school in Ballinasloe County Galway. It has an obelisk, pond, steps (nicknamed the 40 steps) (that have no current use but were previously one of many entrances into the vast estate) and a system of tunnels (that are now closed) on its grounds. It is owned by the Roman Catholic Diocese of Clonfert and is inhabited by a local priest who serves as a groundskeeper.

It was once used as a hospital by the English after the Battle of Aughrim in 1691. Following the secession of the Irish Free State from the United Kingdom in 1921, the House along with the surrounding land which constituted Garbally Park was sold to the Roman Catholic Diocese of Clonfert, transferring ownership of all fixed assets to the Catholic Church. The following year in 1922 St. Joseph's College, the diocesan second-level school of Clonfert, moved its premises to Garbally Park, henceforth being commonly referred to as Garbally College. Until 2008, the house served as residence to boarding students at Garbally College until the boarding of students at the college came to an end in the same year.

References

External links
Turtle Bunbury; Clancarty

Buildings and structures in County Galway